Jeannette Délali Ahonsou (born 1954 in Lavie) is a Togolese novelist. She holds an English Degree from the University of Benin (current University of Lomé) and is a retired English instructor.

Bibliography 
She writes primarily in French and has published four books, including Une Longue Histoire, which earned her the Prix Littéraire France-Togo in 1995. 

 
 
 Le Piège à Conviction (2013). Lomé: Editions Awoudy. 
 Un Tunnel sans Bout (2015). Lomé: Editions Les Continents.

References

External links 
 Official website

1954 births
Living people
Women novelists
Togolese novelists
20th-century novelists
21st-century novelists
University of Lomé alumni
20th-century Togolese women writers
20th-century Togolese writers
21st-century Togolese women writers
21st-century Togolese writers